Bierley may refer to:

Bierley, Isle of Wight, a hamlet in England
Bierley, West Yorkshire, an area in City of Bradford, West Yorkshire, England
Paul E. Bierley, an American music historian

See also 
East Bierley, an area in Kirklees, West Yorkshire, England